The 2016 Rhineland-Palatinate state election was held on 13 March 2016 to elect the members of the Landtag of Rhineland-Palatinate. It was held on the same day as the Baden-Württemberg state election and Saxony-Anhalt state election. The incumbent coalition government of the Social Democratic Party (SPD) and The Greens led by Minister-President Malu Dreyer was defeated. The SPD remained the largest party, and formed a "traffic light coalition" with the Free Democratic Party (FDP) and The Greens. Dreyer was subsequently re-elected as Minister-President.

Parties
The table below lists parties represented in the previous Landtag of Rhineland-Palatinate.

Opinion polling

Results
< 2011    2021 >
|-
|colspan=7| 
|-
!style="background-color:#E9E9E9" align=left colspan="2" rowspan="2" width=400 |Party
!style="background-color:#E9E9E9" align=center colspan="3" |Popular vote
!style="background-color:#E9E9E9" align=center colspan="3" |Seats
|-
!style="background-color:#E9E9E9" align=right width=60|Votes
!style="background-color:#E9E9E9" align=right width=40|%
!style="background-color:#E9E9E9" align=right width=50|+/–
!style="background-color:#E9E9E9" align=right width=30|Seats
!style="background-color:#E9E9E9" align=right width=30|+/–
|-

|  Sozialdemokratische Partei Deutschlands – SPD|| 771,848 || 36.2 || 0.5 || 39 || 3
|-
|  Christlich Demokratische Union Deutschlands – CDU|| 677,507 || 31.8 || 3.4 || 35 || 6
|-
|  Alternative für Deutschland – AfD|| 268,628 || 12.6 || 12.6 || 14 || 14
|-
|  Freie Demokratische Partei – FDP|| 132,294 || 6.2 || 2.0 || 7 || 7
|-
|  Bündnis 90/Die Grünen|| 113,261 || 5.3 || 10.1 || 6 || 12
|-
|  Die Linke|| 59,970 || 2.8 || 0.2 || – || –
|-
| || align=left | Free Voters Rhineland-PalatinateFreie Wähler|| 47,924 || 2.2 || 0.1 || – || –
|-
|  Piratenpartei|| 16,708 || 0.8 || 0.8 || – || –
|-
|  Allianz für Fortschritt und Aufbruch – ALFA|| 13,154 || 0.6 || 0.6 || – || –
|-
|  Nationaldemokratische Partei Deutschlands – NPD|| 10,565 || 0.5 || 0.6 || – || –
|-
|  Ökologisch-Demokratische Partei – ÖDP|| 8,623 || 0.4 ||  || – || –
|-
|  Die Republikaner – REP|| 5,090 || 0.2 ||  || – || –
|-
| || align=left | Die Einheit|| 3,105 || 0.1 || 0.1 || – || –
|-
| || align=left | The Third WayDer III. Weg|| 1,944 || 0.1 || 0.1 || – || –
|-
| bgcolor="white"| || align=left |Other parties|| – || – || – || – || –
|- style="background-color:#E9E9E9"
| align="right" colspan="2" | Valid votes
| 2,130,621
| 98.6
| 0.7
| colspan=2 rowspan=2 color=#BAB9B9|
|- style="background-color:#E9E9E9"
| align="right" colspan="2" | Invalid votes
| 30,885
| 1.4
| 0.7
|- style="background-color:#E9E9E9"
| align="right" colspan="2" | Totals and voter turnout
| 2,161,506	
| 70.4 
| 8.6
|  101 
|  – 
|- style="background-color:#BAB9B9"
| colspan="2" | Electorate
| 3,071,972
| 100.0
| —
| colspan=2|
|-
| colspan=11 align=left | Source: Landeswahlleiter
|}

References

External links
 Rhineland-Palatinate Electoral Office

2016 elections in Germany
2016
March 2016 events in Germany